Harold C. Armstrong was a US politician. He was elected to the New York State Legislature in 1933, 1934 and 1935.

References

Year of birth missing
Year of death missing
Members of the New York State Assembly